Idin or IDIN may refer to:

 IDIN, the International Development Innovation Network
 Idin, Iran, a village in Iran

See also 
 Yidin (disambiguation)
 Edin